Ebenezer Quartey (born 25 August 1934) is a Ghanaian sprinter. He competed in the men's 400 metres at the 1964 Summer Olympics.

References

1934 births
Living people
Athletes (track and field) at the 1964 Summer Olympics
Ghanaian male sprinters
Olympic athletes of Ghana
Athletes (track and field) at the 1962 British Empire and Commonwealth Games
Commonwealth Games bronze medallists for Ghana
Commonwealth Games medallists in athletics
Place of birth missing (living people)
Medallists at the 1962 British Empire and Commonwealth Games